Pedro Fernández de Lugo (1475 Seville –1536 Santa Marta) was the second adelantado of the Canary Islands and governor of Tenerife and La Palma, a title confirmed again by Charles I of Spain, in Barcelona, on August 17, 1519. Pedro Fernández de Lugo was the son of Alonso Fernández de Lugo. Born in Seville, Pedro arrived at Gran Canaria as a young child and later accompanied his father to expeditions to Barbary. In 1509, his father gave him some of the rights and powers over the coast of Africa that he had acquired in 1499. Pedro commanded the tower of Santa Cruz de Mar Pequeña and participated in expeditions against the Berbers alongside the Portuguese.

At the age of sixty, he organized an expedition to present-day Colombia in the New World.  Backed financially by Cristóbal Francesquini and Juan Alberto Gerardini, a Florentine residing in Tenerife from 1510, Pedro Fernández de Lugo departed in 1535 appointed as Governor of Santa Marta. Fernández de Lugo appointed Licentiate Gonzalo Jiménez de Quesada as General Lieutenant of the expedition whose purpose was to find the source of the Magdalena River and a land path to Peru. The expedition ended up discovering and conquering the Muisca. Fernández de Lugo died in 1536, before receiving news of the newly discovered Muisca.

References

External links
 La expedición a Santa Marta de don Pedro Fernández de Lugo (1535) 

Spanish explorers
History of Colombia
1475 births
1536 deaths
Politicians from the Canary Islands
16th-century Spanish people